Craig Gallivan is a Welsh actor best known for playing Callum Watson in the ITV1 series Footballers Wives and the ITV2 spin-off Footballers' Wives: Extra Time and as Luke in Ruth Jones’ multi award-winning Sky1 television series Stella. In 2018, Craig took over the lead role in the Andrew Lloyd Webber musical School of Rock and holds the record as the longest serving ‘Dewey’ in the shows West End history.

Early Years
Craig Gallivan spent his early years playing rugby. At the age of 12, he was selected to play for his home city of Swansea and went on to represent West Wales.

Craig's younger sister Hayley was part of a youth drama group who travelled to London to audition for Cameron Macintosh's musical Oliver at the London Palladium. Somewhat reluctantly, Craig was persuaded to join them. Several recalls later, Craig was offered a part in the Sam Mendes production and in a matter of weeks was performing on the West End stage in front of 2000 people alongside Barry Humphries and Jim Dale. When the production was finally over Craig decided to pursue a career in acting.

Career
At the age of 18, Craig was offered a place at the renowned drama school RADA (Royal Academy of Dramatic Art) where he trained for 3 years. By this time, Craig had already made a number of stage and TV appearances including the BAFTA award-winning BBC drama Care (2000). On graduating from RADA, Craig was launched into millions of UK homes playing Callum Watson in ITV's hit TV show Footballers Wives (2006). The show was later shown internationally including across America via BBC Worldwide. Craig has gone on to star in numerous theatrical, TV and film productions including leading roles for The Royal Shakespeare Company (2008) and National Theatre (2008) in London, BBC's Dr Who spin-off Torchwood (2009). He played Tony Elliot in the multi Olivier and Tony award-winning Billy Elliot (2010), directed by Stephen Daldry, and was nominated for Best Supporting Actor.

Craig starred as Luke Morris in the hit SKY1 comedy-drama Stella, created by Ruth Jones. The show ran for 6 seasons, winning numerous awards, has been hailed as SKY1's most watched show ever and seen the second-biggest UK comedy launch in multichannel history with its debut in 2012.

Filmography

TV

References

External links 
 

1984 births
Living people
Welsh male television actors
Male actors from Swansea
Alumni of RADA
21st-century Welsh male actors